Laura Betti ( Trombetti; 1 May 1927 – 31 July 2004) was an Italian actress known particularly for her work with directors Federico Fellini, Pier Paolo Pasolini and Bernardo Bertolucci. She had a long friendship with Pasolini and made a documentary about him in 2001.

Betti became famous for portraying bizarre, grotesque, eccentric, unstable or maniacal roles, like Regina in Bernardo Bertolucci's 1900, Anna the medium in Twitch of the Death Nerve, Giovanna la pazza in Woman Buried Alive, hysterical Rita Zigai in Sbatti il mostro in prima pagina, Therese in Private Vices, Public Virtues, Emilia the servant in Pier Paolo Pasolini's Teorema for which she won the Volpi Cup for Best Actress, and Mildred the protagonist's wife in Mario Bava's Hatchet for the Honeymoon.

Early life
Born Laura Trombetti in Casalecchio di Reno, near Bologna, she grew up to be interested in singing. She first worked professionally in the arts as a jazz singer and moved to Rome.

Film career
Betti made her film debut in Federico Fellini's La Dolce Vita (1960). In 1963, she became a close friend of the poet and movie director Pier Paolo Pasolini. Under his direction, she proved a wonderful talent and played in seven of his films, including La ricotta (1963), Teorema (Theorem, 1968), his 1972 version of The Canterbury Tales, in which she played the Wife of Bath; and his controversial Salo (1975) ("120 Days of Sodom").

In 1976, Betti portrayed Regina, a cruel and eroto-maniacal fascist in Bernardo Bertolucci's Novecento (1900). She also played Miss Blandish in his Last Tango in Paris (1972), though her single scene was deleted.

In 1973 she dubbed the voice of the Devil for the Italian version of William Friedkin's The Exorcist.

From the 1960s, Betti dedicated much of her time to literature and politics. She became the muse for a number of leading political and literary figures in Italy and came to personify the revolutionary and Marxist era of 1970s Italy.

In 2001, she made a documentary about Pasolini, Pier Paolo Pasolini e la ragione di un sogno. She also donated her papers related to their long friendship along with more than 1000 volumes and many documents connected to Pasolini to the archives of the Fondazione Cineteca di Bologna, thus creating the Centro Studi Archivio Pier Paolo Pasolini. This Centro, strongly wanted by Betti, owns also thousands of photograph and all the works of Pasolini: poetry, literature, cinema and journalism. After her death in 2004 her brother Sergio Trombetti has donated all the personal documents of her career to the Centro that has absorbed them under the name Fondo Laura Betti.

Selected filmography

Discography

LP 
 Laura Betti con l'orchestra di Piero Umiliani (Jolly LPJ 5020,  1960) 
 Laura Betti canta Kurt Weill 1900-1933 (Ricordi SMRL 6031, 1963)
 Laura Betti canta Kurt Weill 1933-1950 (Ricordi SMRL 6032, 1963)

EP 
 Laura Betti con Piero Umiliani e la sua orchestra. La commedia è finita/La canzone del giramondo/La canzone del tempo/Una venere ottimista (RCA Italiana A72U0220, 1958)
 Quattro canzoni con Laura Betti. Amare vuol dire mentire/ I hate Rome/ Lucciola/ Satellite (Jolly EPJ 3000, 1960) 
 Laura Betti con l'orchestra di Piero Umiliani. Quella cosa in Lombardia/Piero/Io son' una  (Jolly EPJ 3004, 1960)
 Laura Betti con l'orchestra di Piero Umiliani. Macrì Teresa detta Pazzia/Valzer della toppa/Cocco di mamma (Jolly EPJ 3005, 1960)
 Laura Betti con l'orchestra di Piero Umiliani. Venere tascabile/Vera signora/E invece no  (Jolly EPJ 3006, 1960)
 Laura Betti dal film 'Cronache del '22' . Nel '22 sognavo già l'amore/Proprio oggi/Sulla strada che va a Reggio/La prima volta (Jolly EPJ3009, 1961)
 Laura Betti N.1.  Je me jette/La parade du suicide/Je hais Rome/La belle Léontine (Chansons d'Orphée 150019, 1962)
 Laura Betti N.2.  Je sais vivre/Piero/Maria le Tatuage/Une vraie dame (Chansons d'Orphée, 150021b, 1962)
  Laura Betti e Paolo Poli. Doppio EP. La bambinona/Guglielmino/La bella Leontine/Io Corpus Domini 1938/Mi butto/Donna bocca bella/Donna Lombarda/Orrenda madre/La Lisetta/La Ninetta/La Morettina/La Gigiotta (Carosello LC4001/2, 1964)
Ordine e disordine. Ai brigoli di Casalecchio/M'hai scocciata, Johnny/Monologo della buca/Solitudine/Lamento del nord (I dischi del sole DS 40, 1965)

Singles 
 Les pantoufles à papa/L'attesa (Rca Italiana N0595, 1957)
 Venere tascabile/Seguendo la flotta (Jolly  J 20135, 1960)
 Ballata dell'uomo ricco/Ballata del pover'uomo (Jolly  J 20128, 1961)
 E invece no/Solamente gli occhi'' (Jolly  J 20136X45, 1961)

References

External links
 
 
 Il Manifesto Obituaries

1927 births
2004 deaths
20th-century Italian actresses
Actors from Bologna
Italian film actresses
Volpi Cup for Best Actress winners
Ciak d'oro winners